Agelas is a genus of sea sponge in the class Demospongiae.

Ecology and distribution

Spicules
Some authorities report that the spongin fibres contain no coring spicules while others report that there are some of variable length. Fernando Parra-Velandia however, describing the Caribbean species in the group, writes that "The presence of verticillated acanthostyle spicules and a fibroreticulate skeleton of spongin fibres cored and/or echinated by spicules characterize this group."

Species
The World Register of Marine Species includes the following species in the genus:

References

Agelasida
Sponge genera